ISAVE Is a professional Handball team based in Póvoa de Lanhoso, Portugal. It plays in LPA.

References 
 http://www.abola.pt

Portuguese handball clubs
University and college sports clubs in Portugal
Sport in Póvoa de Lanhoso